Tomás Lozano-Pérez is a Spanish-American computer science professor at the Massachusetts Institute of Technology and member of MIT's Computer Science and Artificial Intelligence Laboratory. On the MIT faculty since 1981, he conducts research in robotics, motion planning and geometric algorithms, and their applications.

Awards and honors
2011 IEEE Robotics Pioneer Award
1985 Presidential Young Investigator Award
A Fellow of the Association for the Advancement of Artificial Intelligence, a Fellow of the Association for Computing Machinery (ACM), and a Fellow of the Institute of Electrical and Electronics Engineers

References

Fellows of the Association for Computing Machinery
Living people
Year of birth missing (living people)
MIT School of Engineering faculty